Salem is a census-designated place (CDP) in Burke County, North Carolina, United States. The population was 2,218 at the 2010 census. It is part of the Hickory–Lenoir–Morganton Metropolitan Statistical Area.

History
The town of Salem was originally designed as a Moravian settlement by Frederick William von Marschall in 1772 as part of the Wachovia Tract. The Moravians had previously bought this 99,000 acre plot of land from Lord Granville in 1753. At first, von Marschall sold the plots of land only to Moravians, which led to some conflict. The restrictions were slowly lifted, and by 1856 the Moravian church ended the lease system.

Gilboa Methodist Church was listed on the National Register of Historic Places in 1984. 

The city of Salem, Indiana is named after the community as one of its founders was from the area.

Geography
Salem is located in central Burke County at  (35.703920, -81.698820). It is bordered to the north by the city of Morganton, the county seat.

U.S. Route 64 (Burkemont Avenue) is the main road through the community, leading north into Morganton and southwest  to Rutherfordton. Interstate 40 passes along the northern edge of the CDP, with access from Exit 103 (US-64).

Demographics

2020 census

As of the 2020 United States census, there were 2,356 people, 890 households, and 444 families residing in the CDP.

2000 census
As of the census of 2000, there were 2,923 people, 918 households, and 678 families residing in the CDP. The population density was 692.3 people per square mile (267.4/km2). There were 962 housing units at an average density of 227.9 per square mile (88.0/km2). The racial makeup of the CDP was 78.86% White, 15.91% African American, 0.48% Native American, 1.81% Asian, 0.44% Pacific Islander, 1.27% from other races, and 1.23% from two or more races. Hispanic or Latino of any race were 2.19% of the population.

There were 918 households, out of which 29.5% had children under the age of 18 living with them, 56.6% were married couples living together, 11.0% had a female householder with no husband present, and 26.1% were non-families. 22.8% of all households were made up of individuals, and 8.0% had someone living alone who was 65 years of age or older. The average household size was 2.45 and the average family size was 2.82.

In the CDP the population was spread out, with 25.0% under the age of 18, 21.8% from 18 to 24, 21.2% from 25 to 44, 21.5% from 45 to 64, and 10.5% who were 65 years of age or older. The median age was 28 years. For every 100 females there were 153.1 males. For every 100 females age 18 and over, there were 147.5 males.

The median income for a household in the CDP was $32,050, and the median income for a family was $45,430. Males had a median income of $28,672 versus $21,913 for females. The per capita income for the CDP was $14,506. About 9.5% of families and 10.7% of the population were below the poverty line, including 11.6% of those under age 18 and 17.7% of those age 65 or over.

Education
 Salem Elementary School
 Robert Logan Patton High School
 Liberty Middle School

References

Census-designated places in Burke County, North Carolina